Richard Ross Sinclair Tracey  (18 August 1948 – 11 October 2019) was an Australian military and civil judge and barrister, who was Judge Advocate General of the Australian Defence Force from 2007 to 2014, and a judge of the Federal Court of Australia from 2006 to 2018. Following his retirement from the Federal Court, Tracey was appointed as a commissioner of the Royal Commission into Aged Care Quality and Safety, however he died of cancer before the commission provided its interim report.

In the 2014 Australia Day Honours Tracey was made a Member of the Order of Australia for "exceptional service in the field of military law, as a consultant for the Director of Army Legal Services, and as Judge Advocate General of the Australian Defence Force".

References

1948 births
2019 deaths
Military personnel from Melbourne
Judges of the Federal Court of Australia
Australian King's Counsel
Australian barristers
Australian generals
Academic staff of the University of Melbourne
Melbourne Law School alumni
People educated at Melbourne High School
Members of the Order of Australia
Deaths from cancer in California